A Minecraft mod is an independent, user-made modification to the open world sandbox game Minecraft. Tens of thousands of these mods exist, with users able to download them from the Internet, commonly for free. Utilizing additional software, several mods can be used at the same time in order to enhance the gameplay.

Minecraft mods are available for computer and mobile versions of the game, but legacy console versions cannot be modded with practical methods.

Feasibility
Minecraft is a video game particularly known for its adaptability for modifications. Over the course of many years, various independent programmers have taken advantage of that in order to either create additional content for the game, or modify existing existing content for the game. These modifications are more commonly known as "mods".

The Java Edition of Minecraft (available for Windows, MacOS, and Linux) can be modded via the client or server. Client side mods require the player to add files to their game folder and use a mod launcher/loader such as Forge. Server modding leaves the player's game folder untouched and only changes the behavior of the server, to which the player can log on in order to play a slightly varied game. Client mods can change the behavior and appearance of any aspect of the game, and commonly add new blocks, items, mobs, vehicles, and even dimensions. Server mods (commonly referred to as plugins) can add minigames, anti-cheat, or login systems.    

Client mods can result in loss of performance (due to generally heavy resource demands) on older or weaker computers, especially if the player combines many mods together into a "modpack". Modifications to the Java Edition of Minecraft are possible because for each new version of the game, the community reverse-engineers Minecraft source code, which is written in Java, to make these modifications  Mojang and Microsoft provide no modding API for the Java edition, although Mojang does provide methods for deobfuscating the game.

Modding for the mobile and console versions of Minecraft on the Bedrock codebase is different as those versions are written in C++ rather than Java. Players who wish to mod their game on Bedrock codebase versions have a simpler process due to the version's built-in official support for "add-ons", which can be installed faster and easier than Java Edition mods and do not require external mod loaders. However, addons in Bedrock Edition have less flexibility and features because they can only modify features that Mojang explicitly allows and exposes.

Data Packs 

Minecraft also provides a feature known as "data packs" which allow players or server operators to provide additional features or content into the game by the use of a limited API that can be interacted with by using a data pack. This system built upon the idea provided by the resource pack system that already existed and allowed players to customise the game's visuals. 

While data packs are more limited in scope than full mods are, they do not require the installation of third party launchers as the features are supported by the base game. New commands and rules continue to be added to the data pack API as it is actively in development.

Producing a data pack involves creating a zip file containing JSON files in a structure which Minecraft will understand. Issues can also arise when multiple data packs are used at once if they all attempt to override the same file provided in the game's default data pack.

History

The first ever version of Minecraft was released in May 2009, but client-side modding of the game did not become popular in earnest until the game reached its alpha stage in June 2010. The only mods that were released during Minecraft Indev and Infdev development stages were a few client-side mods that had minor changes to the game.

Alpha

With the release of Minecraft Alpha, the first server-side mods began to appear. One of them was hMod, which added some simple but necessary tools to manage a server. Michael Stoyke, also known as Searge (who would later go on to work for Mojang), created Minecraft Coder Pack (MCP). This was later renamed to Mod Coder Pack, keeping the same acronym. MCP was a tool that decompiled and deobfuscated Minecraft code. MCP would recompile and obfuscate new and changed classes, which could be injected into the game. However, if multiple mods modified the same base code, it could cause conflicts resulting in an error. To solve this problem, Risugami's  was created to prevent any conflicts occurring due to multiple mods modifying the same base classes or game resources.

Beta
Towards the end of 2010, Minecraft was preparing to move into its beta development phase, and popular mods such as IndustrialCraft, Railcraft and BuildCraft were first released. As opposed to their predecessors, these mods had the potential to change the entire game instead of simply tweaking minor aspects of it. 

Bukkit, a server-side mod intended to replace hMod was also released. Later, CraftBukkit, a server software that implemented the Bukkit API was also released, it allowed server owners to install plugins to modify the server's way of taking input and giving output to the player without players having to install client-side mods.

Around November 2011, the Forge  and Minecraft Forge were released. Forge allowed players to be able to run several mods simultaneously, utilizing Mod Coder Pack mappings. A server version of Forge was also released, which allowed players to create modded servers. Forge ended the necessity to manipulate the base source code, allowing separate mods to run together without requiring them to touch the base source code. Forge also included many libraries and hooks which made mod development easier.

Release

After Minecraft was fully released in November 2011, the game's modding community continued to grow. In February 2012, Mojang hired developers of the Bukkit to work on an official modding API, allowing mod developers easier access to the Minecraft game files. Bukkit was then maintained by the community. A fork of CraftBukkit, called Spigot which was backward compatible with plugins started to be developed. 

In 2012, Spigot released a server software made to link many servers together via a proxy "linking" server. The project was called BungeeCord, and had a separate plugin API from spigot where spigot plugins could work side by side. Many popular Minecraft servers use BungeeCord to link up Minecraft servers together. A programmer by the name of minecrafter also released a modified version of BungeeCord called Waterfall, which included optimizations that were not present in BungeeCord. This was later continued by Andrew Steinborn (Tux) when he created the Velocity proxy.

In 2013, Forge would surpass Risugami's  as it wasn't being updated in time by its developers. 

In early 2014, a server software named Sponge was released with a very powerful plugin API compared to Bukkit and support for Forge mods. Sponge also introduced mixins, an alternative to modifying byte code.

Microsoft's Acquisition

Concern arose following Microsoft's acquisition of Mojang in late 2014. Members of the modding community feared that Minecrafts new American owners would put an end to Mojang's established practice of giving free rein to mod developers. Despite the concerns, Microsoft did not announce any changes to Mojang's policies, and modding was unaffected.

In April 2015, Microsoft announced that it was adding a Minecraft Mod Developer Pack to Microsoft Visual Studio, granting users of the application creation software an easier way to program Minecraft mods. Microsoft released the new pack open source and free of charge, amidst a drive to push towards more open source software.

A server software for 1.12.2 named Magma was released, which allowed using PaperMC plugins and Forge mods together.

On July 4, 2015 a "Windows 10" version of Minecraft was announced. This, unlike the previous versions, was to be programmed in C++. This announcement sparked concern amongst the game's fanbase that the Java-based versions would end up being phased out entirely, which would hamper the production of mods as C++ is not as "reverse engineerable" as Java is known to be. However, Mojang developer Tommaso Checchi reassured fans on Reddit that modding was "too important" to Minecraft for the Java-based versions to be discontinued.

In September 2016, a new modding toolchain and mod loader called Fabric was released. Fabric devised its own set of free mappings to use instead of Mod Coder Pack mappings. Fabric also supported Sponge's mixins. Fabric was very light, it and did not have all the elements of a Forge mod. It could also be released from developmental snapshot versions of Minecraft, which other mod loaders could not.

In April 2017, Mojang announced the upcoming creation of the Minecraft Marketplace, where players would be able to sell user-created content for the Windows 10 version of the game (Running on the Minecraft Bedrock codebase). This new digital store would specialize in adventure maps, skins, and texture packs. PC World noted that this addition would move the Windows 10 version "a bit closer to the moddable worlds familiar to classic players" of the original Java Edition.

In 2018, Forge underwent a large rewrite, partially because of the large changes in Java Edition version 1.13 and to create a new long-term support system for upcoming versions. This made many modders use 1.12.2 as their primary version. The Mod Coder Pack also stopped receiving updates past 1.12.2. 

In late 2018, Fabric underwent a complete rewrite. Mappings' names were changed, and more hooks were added to make modding easier. Fabric also began becoming very popular, and after Minecraft version 1.14 the modding community began to split between Forge and Fabric. Forge released their new long-term support system for Java Edition version 1.14, and updating mods to newer versions was made easier.

Mod content

The total number of Minecraft mods is difficult to calculate because of how numerous they are. One repository website, CurseForge, features over 100,000 mods .

The types and sorts of content added by these modifications also take on many different forms.

Technology mods are mods that adds an assortment of machines that can help the player to automate the production of certain in-game materials. Examples of technology-oriented mods include Extra Utilities, a mod that introduces various machines that can be used to generate power, and a random assortment of other blocks and items; Ender IO, a mod that adds several machines and a multitude of conduits to transport energy, items and fluids; BuildCraft, a classic mod known for its many variants of machines, pumps, and pipes; and IndustrialCraft, a mod which adds metals, electric tools, generators (including nuclear reactors), jetpacks, powered armor, and nuclear items. Its power system also tries to mimic real-life electrical circuits in an intuitive way. 

In addition to IndustrialCraft metal weapons, other projects allow for an even wider range of available weaponry.

Flan's Mod has modern-style warfare; including guns, tanks and grenades. Tinkers' Construct allows players to forge and customize their own tools and weapons, some involving a foundry or a forge.

Other mods attempt to customize the natural elements in Minecraft, with mods like Natura and Forestry adding new trees and crops. The latter added multiblock automatic farms, beekeeping and butterfly-keeping. Mo' Creatures, on the other hand, focuses rather on adding many animal species into Minecraft. 

Pixelmon supplements the game with monsters and mechanics such as battling, catching, and gyms from the Pokémon franchise. Fossils & Archaeology provides for dinosaurs. CustomNPCs and Millenaire upgrade the game's NPC's.

There are also mods that add new dimensions that can be visited by the player. Mods like Galacticraft and Advanced Rocketry allow players to build rockets in order to fly to the Moon and several planets, and collect their resources. Twilight Forest creates a dimension that enables players to explore a fantasy-style forest and hunt for treasures.

Not all mods will add gameplay elements, however. Others merely tweak the GUI, for example by adding a minimap. Others try to smoothen the game rendering, like OptiFine. Many allow the player to browse through all the items in both the base game and the player's mods and look up how to craft them, like JEI (Just Enough Items).

OptiFine is the most popular Minecraft mod. It decreases the computer resource usage of the game and adds support for installable “shader packs” to Minecraft. These shader packs can completely change the game's graphics by adding shadows, dynamic lights, reflective surfaces, and other effects. Some shaders are even beginning to implement more advanced features like ray tracing, physically based rendering, and parallax occlusion mapping into Java Edition. Most shaders are, however, very hardware-demanding.

Reception 
PC Worlds Nate Ralph calls installing mods for Minecraft "a somewhat convoluted process", but does admit it could serve the player who desires "a little more out of the experience" of playing the game.

Max Eddy of PC Magazine also raises a point concerning the process of setting up a game augmented with mods, claiming "it seems rather complicated" and that at first he was "too afraid to mod Minecraft at all", but learned to appreciate it when he realized that modding Minecraft is "pretty forgiving". Eddy does nevertheless mention that he feels Mojang's fast development pace regarding the main game has slowed down the progress of the most popular mods.

Similarly, Benjamin Abbott of Metro agrees that adding mods to Minecraft is "a thorough pain in the backside", though he concedes that "the result is usually worth it".

Minecraft mod Galacticraft was mod of the week in PC Gamer in July 2013.

At San Jose Mercury News, George Avalos claims that mods are definitely suited for "mainstream enthusiasts", but does warn that precaution must be taken in order to avoid downloading "dangerous and spammy software" when looking for Minecraft mods. Avalos also remarks that installing mods will probably require adult attention, even though Minecraft typically appeals to children.

Controversies 

There have been some mod-related controversies with Minecraft, one of which surrounded a mod called GregTech, which was aimed at increasing Minecrafts difficulty. 

In 2013, its developer noticed that some of GregTech's crafting recipes would be overwritten by another mod named Tinkers' Construct, and deliberately inserted code into GregTech which would crash the game client if it detected any other mods. The authors of both mods would later settle their dispute.

Another surrounded the mod Bukkit, an API which enabled others to install server-side mods. In 2014, the leader of the Bukkit team Warren "EvilSeph" Loo (who previously worked for Mojang) announced that development would cease, and Mojang stepped in to save the project. With Mojang's announcement, the intellectual rights to the project became ambiguous. Licensing conflicts arose between the original creators of Bukkit and maintainers, largely revolving around who "owned" the project after the primary maintainers resigned. One major contributor tried to pull the rights to use their code in the game, effectively forcing Bukkit to fall in a state of disrepair for a time.

Another controversy came about in March 2017, when Slovakian cyber company ESET revealed that 87 examples of trojan horse malware were distributed through the Google Play Store under the guise of Minecraft mods. Their purpose was to either display adverts or con players into downloading other apps. Combined, these fake mods gathered over one million downloads in the first three months of 2017.

Modpacks
Mods are sometimes grouped together in downloadable content called "modpacks". These can be easily downloaded and played by the user without requiring the player to have extensive knowledge on how to set up mods in the game. Content creators use this to their advantage in order to allow mods to interact (alter the vanilla gameplay) so that a particular experience can be delivered, sometimes aided by throwing configuration files and custom textures into the mix. 

The most popular modpacks can be downloaded and installed through launchers, like Feed the Beast, Technic Launcher, ATLauncher and CurseForge Desktop App.

Official support
In 2012, Mojang said they were starting work on a repository for Minecraft mods. Their help website lists video tutorials that teach the player how to install and play Minecraft mods.

Minecrafts creator Markus "Notch" Persson admitted in 2012 that he was initially skeptical of mods, fearing that the user-made content would threaten his vision for the game. Persson says he came around, as he claims to have realized that mods are "a huge reason of what Minecraft is". In some cases, authors of mods even ended up getting a job at Mojang, and some in-game features, such as pistons and horses, were originally from mods.

In 2016, Mojang announced their official support for mods for the Bedrock version of Minecraft, where they are known as "add-ons".

Minecraft Education Edition 

Minecraft mods are credited for being a gateway for children to pick up coding and programming. Several educational projects have been created to further encourage students to learn coding through Minecraft, including LearnToMod, ComputerCraftEdu, and Minecraft: Pi Edition, all of which are offered free to teachers. Programming classes utilizing Minecraft were also started by the University of California, which aims to teach children aged 8–18 how to program applications.

In 2011, MinecraftEdu formed to sell a version of Minecraft to schools that enabled the teaching of a wider variety of subjects including language, history and art. In January 2016, Microsoft announced a new tool, "Minecraft: Education Edition", which would be designed specifically for classroom use and which would continue on the legacy of "MinecraftEdu" to teach a wide variety of subjects using Minecraft.

In The Parent's Guidebook to Minecraft, author Cori Dusmann denotes that homeschooling and Minecraft make for an interesting match, as creating simple mods can be an "illustration of scientific principles," to which homeschooling providers are receptive.

The idea of introducing Minecraft into school curriculums was resisted by Tom Bennett, who serves as an adviser to the British government. According to Bennett, Minecraft was a gimmick, and schools would do well to "drain the swamp of gimmicks" and resort to just books for teaching. Bennett's condemnation was rebutted by a number of journalists for The Guardian, who thought that Minecraft in schools was a worthwhile innovation.

Influence on Minecraft itself 
Mod developer Dr. Zhark added horses to the game through the Mo' Creatures mod. Later on he helped Mojang adapt horses for use in standard issue Minecraft. Pistons were also originally a part of a mod made by another developer, Hippoplatimus, but they impressed Minecrafts creators so much that they added the feature to the main game.

Mojang also admitted that they admired all of the work done on server side modding API Bukkit. In 2012, the Swedish company ended up hiring the lead developers of the project.

In 2019, kingbdogz, a Minecraft mod developer who was known for creating The Aether mod stated on Twitter that he was hired by Mojang to work with them for Minecraft.

References

Bibliography
 Rogers Cadenhead, Absolute Beginner's Guide to Minecraft Mods Programming, (Indianapolis: Que Publishing, 2014). 
 Cori Dusmann, The Parent's Guidebook to Minecraft, (San Francisco: Peachpit Press, 2013). 
 Jimmy Koene, Sams Teach Yourself Mod Development for Minecraft in 24 Hours, (Indianapolis: Sams Publishing, 2015). 
 Lars van Schaik and Ronald Vledder (eds.), De ultieme gids voor Minecraft, (Doetinchem: Reshift Digital, 2015). 

Minecraft
Fan labor
Video game mods